So in Hindsight the Professional Rapper Isn't There Yet is an album by John Reuben.

Track listing
"Do Not" (Liquid Beats Club remix)
"Divine Inspiration" (Elected Official remix)
"Gather In" (DJ Form remix)
"Hindsight" (Elected Official remix)
"Breathe" (Liquid Beatsremix)
"Doin'" (Liquid Beats remix)
"Move" (DJ Form remix)
"I Haven't Been Myself" (DJ Form remix)
"Life Is Short" (Elected Official remix)
"Do Not" (Liquid Beats Smoothed Out remix)
"Gather In" (Elected Official remix)
"Life Is Short" (DJ Form remix)

John Reuben albums
2004 remix albums
Gotee Records remix albums